The Sanremo Music Festival 1995 was the 45th annual Sanremo Music Festival, held at the Teatro Ariston in Sanremo, province of Imperia, in the late February 1995 and broadcast by Rai 1.

The show was presented by Pippo Baudo, who also served as the artistic director, with actresses Anna Falchi and Claudia Koll.

The winner of the Big Artists section was Giorgia with the song "Come saprei", which also won the Critics Award. The a cappella group Neri per Caso won the Newcomers section with the song "Le ragazze".
 
In the opening night, shortly after the beginning of the show, a man, Pino Pagano, sat on the edge of the gallery of the theater and showed the intention to commit suicide jumping below, shouting "Pippo, io mi butto" (Italian for "Pippo, I'm jumping"): he was eventually stopped by Baudo himself amid the applause of the audience.

After every night Rai 1 broadcast DopoFestival,  a talk show about the Festival with the participation of singers and  journalists. It was hosted by  Serena Dandini  with Luciano De Crescenzo, Fabio Fazio, Gianni Ippoliti and Pippo Baudo.

Participants and results

Big Artists

Newcomers

Guests

References 

Sanremo Music Festival by year
1995 in Italian music 
1995 in Italian television 
1995 music festivals